Zdeněk Kolář was the defending champion but retired from his first round match with Frederico Ferreira Silva.

Felipe Meligeni Alves won the title after defeating Pablo Andújar 6–3, 4–6, 6–2 in the final.

Seeds

Draw

Finals

Top half

Bottom half

References

External links
Main draw
Qualifying draw

Iasi Open - 1